Mercy is the second full-length album by American rock band Rocco DeLuca and the Burden, released on March 10, 2009. The band worked with famed U2 producer Daniel Lanois on this album and although he originally was slated for only a small selection of songs, the band later decided to enlist his talents for the entire album.  Some descriptive highlights on Mercy include the title track, a slow burning ballad that highlights DeLuca's falsetto and is backed by UK based band Keane, "I Trust You to Kill Me" — a driving dobro and piano centered plea, and the hard rock "Save Yourself", which was used for the promo of the television movie 24: Redemption.

DeLuca started his North America tour promoting this album upon its release on March 10.

Track listing

Chart information

References

Rocco DeLuca and the Burden albums
2009 albums